Luisa Lambertini (born 1963 in Bologna, Italy) is an Italian economist specialized in monetary and fiscal policies. She is a professor of economics at EPFL (École Polytechnique Fédérale de Lausanne), where she holds the Chair of International Finance at the College of Management of Technology.

Career 
Lambertini studied economics at University of Bologna and earned her Laurea cum laude in 1987. At the University of Warwick she further perused studies in economics and gained a master's degree in 1989 for a thesis perused on the supervision of Marcus Miller. She then joined University of California, Berkeley as doctoral student of Maurice Moses Obstfeld and graduated in with a PhD in economics in 1995 with a thesis on "Theory and Evidence on the Accumulation of Large Public Debts".

As an Assistant Professor she joined in 1995 the Department of Economics at University of California, Los Angeles, before going to work as an associate professor at Boston College's Department of Economics in 2003. In 2005, she moved Department of Economics at Claremont McKenna College as an associate professor.

Lambertini joined EPFL's College of Management of Technology first as an associate professor before being promoted as Full Professor in 2009. Since 2007, she has held the Chair of International Finance at the EPFL's College of Management of Technology.

From 1st of July 2023, she will be the new Rector of USI, Università della Svizzera italiana.

Research 
Lambertini's research is interested in on the interplay of monetary and fiscal policies, in the inclusion of housing and mortgage default into macro-economic models, and in the analysis of regulation and macro-prudential policies in models with financial institutions.

Lambertini develops models of general equilibrium macroeconomic for the investigation of economic policies that alleviate the impact of economic crises. Her research has influenced the design of monetary and fiscal institutions as it has elucidated, which interactions of monetary and fiscal policy may lead to sub-optimal equilibria. Her research illuminates the impact of austerity on competitiveness and growth. She also contributed to the development of macro-prudential regulation for banks and its effect on financial stability and lending.

Distinctions 
Since 2021, Lambertini has been the president of the EPFL WISH Foundation, whose vice-president she was from 2019 to 2020. Lambertini is an executive committee member and former president of the International Banking, Economics and Finance Association (IBEFA). She was an advisory council at the Society for Computational Economics (2016-2020), an editor of The B.E. Journal of Macroeconomics (2012-2019), and a member of the Committee for Funding Italian Research Project (PRIN) (2011).

She is a consultant for central banks and policy institutions.

Lambertini is the recipient of the Hoover National Fellowship (2001-2002), the John L. Simpson Memorial Research Fellowship (1994), the Alfred P. Sloan Doctoral Dissertation Fellowship (1993), the University of California, Berkeley Fellowship (1992), the Luciano Jona Fellowship (1990), and the Credito Italiano Award (1988).

From 1977 to 1987 she was a member of the Italian National Handball Team.

Selected works

References

External links 
 
 Chair of International Finance website

1963 births
Living people
Italian economists
University of Bologna alumni
Alumni of the University of Warwick
University of California, Berkeley alumni
Academic staff of the École Polytechnique Fédérale de Lausanne
University of California, Los Angeles faculty
Claremont McKenna College faculty
Boston College faculty
People from Bologna
Italian women scientists
Italian women economists